William Isaac Sarvis (July 1898 – 22 March 1968) was a Welsh footballer. His regular position was as a forward. He was born in Merthyr Tydfil. He played for Aberdare Athletic, Merthyr Town, Manchester United, Bradford City and Walsall.

References

External links
MUFCInfo.com profile

1898 births
1968 deaths
Footballers from Merthyr Tydfil
Welsh footballers
Manchester United F.C. players
Bradford City A.F.C. players
Walsall F.C. players
English Football League players
Association football inside forwards
Aberdare Athletic F.C. players
Merthyr Town F.C. players